Helena Ignez (born May 23, 1942) is a Brazilian actress and filmmaker who participated in the Cinema Marginal movement during the 1960s and 70s alongside Rogério Sganzerla and Glauber Rocha.

Biography 
Helena was born in Salvador, Bahia and was attending her second year of law school when she fell in love with theater and decided to study the Dramatic Arts at the Federal University of Bahia. At the time, the Bahian theater scene was breaking with traditional Brazilian theater and experiencing strong influence from the young vanguard. She first appeared on the screen in Glauber Rocha's film Pátio.

Cinema Marginal 
Helena acted in a few more films, such as A Grande Feira (1961), Assalto ao Trem Pagador (1962), and O Padre e a Moça (1966) before playing Janete Jane in O Bandido da Luz Vermelha by Rogério Sganzerla. After this film, she would perform in some most significant films in the Cinema Marginal movement, the most noted being her role as Ângela Carne e Osso in A Mulher de Todos (1969). She also was a financial partner in Rogério Sganzerla and Júlio Bressane Belair production company. Between 1968 and 1970, Sganzerla and Ignez made almost a dozen films together and were also married and had two children. In 1972 she took a turn in her career and decided to film in Europe, the United States and Africa, making an untitled super-8 film.

Filmography

Film

Acting

Directing

Television

On stage
 1969 – ''Hair'

References

External links 
 

Brazilian actresses
People from Salvador, Bahia
1942 births
Brazilian filmmakers
Living people